Alseodaphne hainanensis is a species of plant in the family Lauraceae. It is found in China and Vietnam. It is threatened by habitat loss.

References

hainanensis
Vulnerable plants
Taxonomy articles created by Polbot
Taxobox binomials not recognized by IUCN